Ernst-Georg Drünkler (8 July 1920 – 12 March 1997) was a German Luftwaffe military aviator during World War II, a night fighter ace credited with 47 aerial victories, including two by day, claimed in 102 combat missions making him the thirtieth most successful night fighter pilot in the history of aerial warfare. The majority of his victories were claimed over the Western Front in Defense of the Reich missions against the Royal Air Force's Bomber Command.

Born in Bernburg, Drünkler grew up in the Weimar Republic and Nazi Germany. Following flight training in 1942, he was posted to Zerstörergeschwader 2 (ZG 2—2nd Destroyer Wing) operating on the Eastern Front, flying a Messerschmitt Bf 110 heavy fighter. In October 1942, Drünkler transferred to Nachtjagdgeschwader 1 (NJG 1—1st Night Fighter Wing), and later to Nachtjagdgeschwader 5 (NJG 5—5th Night Fighter Wing), where he was trained as a night fighter pilot. Flying with NJG 1, he claimed his first nocturnal aerial victory on 13 June 1943. Following his 40th aerial victory, he was awarded the Knight's Cross of the Iron Cross on 20 March 1945 as Staffelkapitän (squadron leader) of the 1. Staffel (1st squadron) of NJG 5. Following the war, he became a teacher and died aged 76 in Sottrum.

World War II
Drünkler was born on 8 July 1920 in Bernburg, at the time in the Weimar Republic. On 16 May 1942, he was posted to the II. Gruppe (2nd group) of Zerstörergeschwader 2 (ZG 2—2nd Destroyer Wing) operating on the Eastern Front of World War II. There, he flew nine ground attack and was credited with the destruction of an armored train, five locomotives, two freight cars and five trucks. Predominately however, he was tasked with making courier flights. On 1 October 1942, Drünkler transferred to the 2. Staffel (2nd squadron) of Nachtjagdgeschwader 5 (NJG 5—5th Night Fighter Wing) where he was trained as a night fighter pilot.

Ruhr defence

Following the 1939 aerial Battle of the Heligoland Bight, Royal Air Force (RAF) attacks shifted to the cover of darkness, initiating the Defence of the Reich campaign. By mid-1940, Generalmajor (Brigadier General) Josef Kammhuber had established a night air defense system dubbed the Kammhuber Line. It consisted of a series of control sectors equipped with radars and searchlights and an associated night fighter. Each sector named a Himmelbett (canopy bed) would direct the night fighter into visual range with target bombers. In 1941, the Luftwaffe started equipping night fighters with airborne radar such as the Lichtenstein radar. This airborne radar did not come into general use until early 1942.

On 12/13 June 1943 RAF Bomber Command committed 503 aircraft—323 Avro Lancasters and 167 Handley-Page Halifax bombers with support from 11 de Havilland Mosquitos to Bochum, as it continued the British Battle of the Ruhr operation. 14 Lancaster and 10 Halifax bombers were lost, 4.8 per cent of the attacking force. Drünkler claimed his first two aerial victories. German pilots claimed 19 Lancasters and 9 Halifax bombers shot down. During this mission, his Messerschmitt Bf 109 G-4 (Werknummer 5427—factory number) sustained combat damage, resulting in a forced landing at Bergervaart, near Bergen op Zoom, which destroyed the aircraft.

On the night of the 21/22 June 705 RAF bombers—262 Lancasters, 209 Halifax, 117 Short Stirlings, 105 Vickers Wellingtons and—12 Mosquitos attacked Krefeld. 17 Halifax, 9 Lancasters, 9 Wellingtons and 9 Stirlings were lost on the operation. This represented 6.2 per cent of the force. The raid was carried out before the full moon period was over and the heavy casualties were mostly caused by night fighters. 12 of the aircraft lost were from the Pathfinders; No. 35 Squadron RAF lost 6 out of the 19 Halifax bombers it sent. The raid took place in good visibility and the Pathfinders produced an almost perfect marking effort, ground-markers dropped by Oboe-equipped Mosquitos were supplemented by the Pathfinder heavies. 619 aircraft bombed struck the area within 3 miles of the centre of the target. Drünkler intercepted the bomber stream west of Makkum and claimed a Short Stirling at 02:39.

On the 23/24 July 1943 Air Marshall Arthur Harris, Air Officer Commanding, Bomber Command, initiated Operation Gomorrah, a concerted attempt to destroy Hamburg and step up the area bombing of German industrial cities. The RAF mustered 791 aircraft—347 Lancasters, 246 Halifax, 125 Stirlings and 73 Wellingtons— for the operation. The British lost 12 aircraft—four Halifaxes, four Lancasters, three Stirlings and a Wellington which amounted to 1.5 per cent of the force. The raid was very successful, "Window" helped confuse German radar defences and H2S radar was used to map and bomb the target. Over the Bay of Kiel in the early hours of 24 July, Drünkler claimed a Halifax shot down at 00:54. It was one of only 12 claims made by the German night fighter pilots that night because of the effectiveness of "window". Six Halifax, a Wellington, two Stirlings and three Lancasters were claimed.

In support of Bomber Command the United States Army Air Force (USAAF) Eighth Air Force also targeted Hamburg, bombing the shipyards. The USAAF referred to the attacks as Blitz Week. 300 B-17 Flying Fortress from the 1st Bombardment Wing were to attack Hamburg, while a small force was to bomb the U-boat yards at Kiel. The 4th Bombardment Wing was to attack the Focke-Wulf plant at Warnemünde, near Rostock. Drünkler's night fighter unit was used in a daylight mission to intercept. At 18:22, the same day, 25 July, northwest of Vlieland, he claimed a B-17 shot down. The 1st Bomb Wing lost 15 B-17s in the operation and the 4th lost four. It is believed most fell after being damaged by anti-aircraft artillery. Jagdgeschwader 1 and Jagdgeschwader 26 intercepted but were not successful. JG 26 claimed three for the loss of two fighters and JG 1 claimed three for the loss of four pilots wounded in action. This mission highlighted the need to upgrade the armament of the Messerschmitt Bf 109 and Focke-Wulf Fw 190. A notable loss was Karl-Heinz Leesmann, who was killed in action and a night fighter crew that came down in the North Sea and were captured by a Royal Navy vessel. Drünkler's claim qualified him as an ace with four night and one day victory.

After a spell as an instructor with 13./NJG 5, he became Staffelkapitän of 1./NJG 5 on 16 February 1944, which he led until the war ended. Drünkler arrived back as the RAF Berlin offensive was coming to an end. He achieved his 6th victory on 24 March 1944 near Langen at 22:23. Another heavy bomber, type unknown, was claimed at 23:10. Thirty minutes later he downed another near Langensalza. On the night of the 30/31 March 1944, Bomber Command suffered its heaviest loss of the war an operation to bomb Nürnberg. Bomber Command dispatched 795 aircraft, including 572 Lancasters, 214 Halifaxes and nine Mosquitos. A further 49 Halifax aircraft were sent on minelaying operations in the Heligoland area, 13 Mosquito night fighters were sent to German night-fighter airfields, 34 Mosquitos flew on diversions to Aachen, Cologne and Kassel. 95 bombers were lost: 64 Lancasters and 31 Halifaxes which amounted to 11.9 per cent of the force. It was the largest Bomber Command loss of the war. Drünkler claimed a Halifax northeast of Frankfurt-am-Main at 00:55. His 10th victory over another Halifax was recorded at 01:06 east of Oberndorf.

Normandy
1./NJG 5 was transferred to France in the spring, 1944. Bomber Command attacked the rail networks in Belgium and France as a prelude to Operation Overlord, scheduled to begin on 6 June 1944. On one such operation, Bomber Command sent 219 aircraft (125 Lancaster and 86 Halifax bombers supported by 8 Mosquitos) to attack the railway yards at Trappes to the west of Paris in 2 waves. Four Lancasters lost on the operation. Another 82 Lancasters and four Mosquitos of No. 5 Group RAF attacked and destroyed a railway junction at Saumur without loss. Drünkler attacked and shot down a Lancaster at 02:05 southwest of Rambouillet. On 2/3 June 1944 Bomber Command sent 128 aircraft—105 Halifaxes, 19 Lancasters and four Mosquitos—of 1, 4 and No. 8 Group RAF attacked the railway yards at Trappes again. 15 Halifax and one Lancaster were lost: 12.5 per cent of the force. Drünkler claimed a heavy bomber (type unknown) over Trappes at 01:00 for his 13th victory. Bomber Command lost 17 aircraft in total this night on operations. German night fighter units claimed 19.

Drünkler had another successful night on the 12/13 June 1944, six days after D-Day, when he accounted for two heavy bombers shot down. One fell north of Arques at 00:43 and the other northwest of Dunkirk at 00:56. Drünkler's victims were from 671 aircraft (348 Halifax and 285 Lancaster, 38 Mosquito) of No 4, 5, 6 and 8 Group, sent to attack communications at Amiens, Longueau, Arras, Caen, Cambrai and Poitiers. 23 bombers including 17 Halifaxes and 6 Lancasters from 4 and 6 Groups were lost. On 24/25 June 1944 535 Lancaster, 165 Halifax bombers, and 39 Mosquito intruders from all RAF groups attacked seven V-1 flying bomb sites. 23 bombers were lost—all Lancasters. Drünkler erroneously claimed a Stirling near Berck-sur-Mer  at 03:45. German pilots claimed 38 bombers that night. A 17th claim made at 28/29 June over Château-Thierry at 01:08 was his last of the month. At 02:18 on 13 July Dunkler scored his 18th victory at "Chaumont"; which Chaumont this refers to was not reported. Drünkler continued his success in France on the 14/15 July when he destroyed two Lancasters west of Chaumont (02:08) and southeast of Bar-sur-Seine (02:17) to reach a total of 20. The victim may have been Lancaster III ND994, UL-F2, of No. 576 Squadron RAF. Flying Officer Raymond Linklater (service number J/25837) and his crew were killed.

Drünkler and his crew scored another double on 18/19 July at 01:37 and 01:45 northwest of Sommevoire and northwest of Condé-en-Barrois, respectively. Drünkler accounted for his last successes on 28/29 July and 4/5 August. On the former night a Lancaster was shot down northwest of Mirecourt at 01:09 and an unknown location at 01:04 on the latter night. On 8/9 August in "Grid GJ" he claimed a Lancaster at 03:10, before sunrise for his 25th victory. It was his last claim in Normandy.

Defence of the Reich
On the last night of the Normandy campaign, as the German front collapsed, Drünkler, 1./NJG 5 was moved to East Prussia. Bomber Command sent 402 Lancasters and one Mosquito of Nos. 1, 3, 6 and 8 Groups to Stettin on 29/30 August 1944. 23 Lancasters were lost, 5.7 per cent of the force. This was a successful raid. A further 189 Lancasters of No. 5 Group carried a successful attack on Königsberg at extreme range. Only 480 tons of bombs could be carried because of the range of the target but severe damage was caused. Wing Commander J. Woodroffe led the attack. Bomber Command estimated that 41 per cent of all the housing and 20 per cent of all the industry in Königsberg was destroyed. There was heavy night fighter opposition over the target and 15 Lancasters, (7.9 per cent of the force) were lost. Northwest of the city he accounted for his 26th victory. Drünkler then engaged a Lancaster northwest of Pillau at 01:56 and claimed the bomber destroyed.

While based in East Prussia, Drünkler accounted for a Red Air Force Ilyushin DB-3 shot down southeast of Georgenburg at 01:56 for his 28th victory. He followed this up with a Lisunov Li-2 on 16/17 October 1944 at 17:57, the location was not recorded in his report. Another of this type at 18:12 on 23 October brought his score to 30. On 1 January 1945, Drünkler was awarded the German Cross in Gold.

On 8/9 February 1945 the Stettin area was attacked by Bomber Command again. A series of raids were carried out on Germany this night and Bomber Command lost 17 aircraft. 10 Lancasters of No. 5 Group began minelaying off Swinemünde, near Stettin. Rail yards at Krefeld were attacked by 151 bombers and the synthetic oil plant at Pölitz was bombed by 475 heavy bombers. Drünkler intercepted three bombers and claimed them shot down within nine minutes: 21:03 to 21:12 southwest and west of the city.  Bomber Command lost Lancaster HK620 from 15 Squadron, LL911 61 Squadron,. ME299 44 Squadron (flown by Flying Officer K. Mangos RNZAF killed with four crewman and two captured), ME314 619 Squadron, ME443, 61 Squadron, ND554 630 Squadron, ND912 7 Squadron, PB737 61 Squadron, and PB759 also from 61 Squadron. German night fighter pilots claimed eight bombers this night, three by Drünkler, three by Walter Borchers of Stab./NJG 5 and one by Hauptmann Herbert Koch of I./NJG 3, for this 18th victory northeast of Copenhagen.

On the night of the 14 February 1945, Bomber Command commenced Operation Thunderclap. The target was Chemnitz: 499 Lancaster and 218 Halifax heavy bombers of No. 1, 3, 4, 6 and 8 Groups bombed the town ineffectively owing to heavy cloud cover. Post-raid reconnaissance suggest the raid was ineffective and although parts of the city were hit, most of the bombs fell in open country. Bomber Command lost eight Lancaster and five Halifax bombers this night. Drünkler intercepted a Lancaster northeast of Chemnitz at shot it down at 21:05 for victory number 34. Chemnitz and Bohlen were the targets on 5/6 March 1945 were struck by 498 and 248 bombers. Drünkler claimed a heavy bomber southeast of Zwickau at 22:05. Two nights later on 7/8 March he claimed a Lancaster northeast of Erfurt for his 36th claim. Drünkler downed a trio of heavy bombers on 16/17 March 1945, over, east and south of Ansbach from 21:15 to 21:43. This night was also notable for the successes of Johannes Hager who claimed five RAF bombers and Herbert Lütje, who claimed his 50th victory that night.

On 20 March 1945, Ernst-Georg Drünkler was awarded the Knight's Cross of the Iron Cross for 39 victories. That night, southwest of Leipzig, in the early hours of 21 March he claimed his 40th victory at 03:28. On 21 March 1945 at 03:38, southwest of Leipzig, Drünkler claimed a Lancaster for his 40th victory. Lancaster I PB845 of No. 463 Squadron RAF on the mission to the synthetic oil refinery at Böhlen, crashed at Tachenau, just south of the target area, killing all seven crew members including pilot Flying Officer Richard Stuart Bennett RAAF (on secondment). It is believed PB845 was destroyed by Drünkler.

By April 1945 the Red Army had reached the Oder and was advancing to Berlin, while on the Western Front, the Western Alliance, which had begun in the third week of March, was now advancing deep into Germany. 1./NJG 5 remained on operations. On 8 April at 22:56, east of Kolleda, Drünkler defeated his 41st opponent. On 10/11 April he claimed three bombers between 22:55 and 23:05 northwest and east of Leipzig. On 17 April northwest of Strasburg and north of Fürstenwalde at 23:21 and 23:47 he accounted for two Ilyushin Il-4s, Drünkler's penultimate victory claims of the war.
Drünkler was credited with 46 aerial victories—45 nocturnal, including five over Russian bombers, and one daytime victory over Boeing B-17 Flying Fortress—plus further seven unconfirmed claims. He flew 102 combat missions, 83 of which as a night fighter, four night ground attack missions, and 15 daytime sorties.

Summary of career

Aerial victory claims
According to Spick, Drünkler was credited with 45 aerial victories which included five claims on the Eastern Front and two daytime claims. Foreman, Parry and Mathews, authors of Luftwaffe Night Fighter Claims 1939 – 1945, researched the German Federal Archives and found records for 46 nocturnal victory claims. Mathews and Foreman also published Luftwaffe Aces — Biographies and Victory Claims, listing Drünkler with 45 claims, plus two further unconfirmed claims. Two claims dated 15 March 1945 are not recorded in Luftwaffe Night Fighter Claims 1939 – 1945 while one claim dated on 2 November 1944 is missing in Luftwaffe Aces — Biographies and Victory Claims.

Victory claims were logged to a map-reference (PQ = Planquadrat), for example "PQ BK-1". These sectors were then subdivided into 36 smaller units to give a location area 3 × 4 km in size.

Awards
 Flugzeugführerabzeichen
 Front Flying Clasp of the Luftwaffe in Gold
 Iron Cross (1939) 2nd andce 1st Class
 German Cross in Gold on 1 January 1945 as Oberleutnant in the 1./Nachtjagdgeschwader 5
 Knight's Cross of the Iron Cross on 20 March 1945 as Hauptmann and Staffelkapitän of the 1./Nachtjagdgeschwader 5

Notes

References

Citations

Bibliography

 
 
 
 
 
 
 
 
 
 
 
 
 
 
 

1920 births
1997 deaths
People from Bernburg
People from the Free State of Anhalt
Luftwaffe pilots
German World War II flying aces
Recipients of the Gold German Cross
Recipients of the Knight's Cross of the Iron Cross
Military personnel from Saxony-Anhalt